The 1988 Scott Tournament of Hearts, the Canadian women's curling championship, was held from February 27 to March 5, 1988 at the Aitken Centre in Fredericton, New Brunswick. The total attendance for the week was 16,929.

Team Ontario, who was skipped by Heather Houston won the title beating defending champion Pat Sanders and Team Canada 6–5 in the final. Ontario made it to the final after winning two tiebreaker games over Manitoba and British Columbia before beating Saskatchewan 7–4 in the semifinal. This was Ontario's second championship overall and the first of back-to-back championships skipped by Houston.

Houston's rink would go onto represent Canada at the 1988 World Women's Curling Championship in Glasgow, Scotland where they took home the silver medal after losing to West Germany in the final.

Prince Edward Island's 3–2 victory over Canada in Draw 13 tied records for the lowest combined score by both teams in one game (5) and the most blank ends in one game (6).

Teams
The teams were listed as follows:

Round Robin standings
Final Round Robin standings

Round Robin results
All draw times are listed in Atlantic Standard Time (UTC-04:00).

Draw 1
Saturday, February 27, 2:00 pm

Draw 2
Saturday, February 27, 8:00 pm

Draw 3
Sunday, February 28, 2:00 pm

Draw 4
Sunday, February 28, 8:00 pm

Draw 5
Monday, February 29, 9:30 am

Draw 6
Monday, February 29, 2:00 pm

Draw 7
Monday, February 29, 8:00 pm

Draw 8
Tuesday, March 1, 9:30 am

Draw 9
Tuesday, March 1, 2:00 pm

Draw 10
Tuesday, March 1, 8:00 pm

Draw 11
Wednesday, March 2, 9:30 am

Draw 12
Wednesday, March 2, 2:00 pm

Draw 13
Wednesday, March 2, 8:00 pm

Draw 14
Thursday, March 3, 2:00 pm

Draw 15
Thursday, March 3, 8:00 pm

Tiebreakers

Round 1
Friday, March 4, 9:30 am

Round 2
Friday, March 4, 2:00 pm

Playoffs

Semifinal
Friday, March 4, 8:00 pm

Final
Saturday, March 5, 2:00 pm

Statistics

Top 5 player percentages
Final Round Robin Percentages

Awards
The all-star team and sportsmanship award winners were as follows:

All-Star Team

Caroline Ball Award 
The Scotties Tournament of Hearts Sportsmanship Award is presented to the curler who best embodies the spirit of curling at the Scotties Tournament of Hearts. The winner was selected in a vote by all players at the tournament. 

Prior to 1998, the award was named after a notable individual in the curling community where the tournament was held that year. For this edition, the award was named after Caroline Ball, who competed in the women's national championship four times for Newfoundland along with serving as president of the Canadian Ladies Curling Association.

Notes

References

Scotties Tournament of Hearts
Scott Tournament of Hearts
Scott Tournament Of Hearts, 1988
Curling competitions in Fredericton
1988 in women's curling
February 1988 sports events in Canada
March 1988 sports events in Canada